The Journal of Consumer Policy is a quarterly peer-reviewed academic journal covering legal and regulatory issues related to consumer behaviour. It was established in 1977 as the Zeitschrift für Verbraucherpolitik and is published by Springer Science+Business Media. The editors-in-chief are Alan Mathios (Cornell University), Hans-W. Micklitz (European University Institute), Lucia Reisch (University of Cambridge), John Thøgersen (Aarhus School of Business, and Christian Twigg-Flesner (University of Warwick). The journal is abstracted and indexed in Scopus, Inspec, EconLit, ProQuest databases, AGRICOLA, EBSCO databases, International Bibliography of the Social Sciences, and Research Papers in Economics.

External links

Quarterly journals
Springer Science+Business Media academic journals
English-language journals
Economics journals
Publications established in 1977